Malashkovo is a rural locality (a village) in Novlenskoye Rural Settlement, Vologodsky District, Vologda Oblast, Russia. The population was 15 as of 2002.

Geography 
Malashkovo is located 86 km northwest of Vologda (the district's administrative centre) by road. Taraskovo is the nearest rural locality.

References 

Rural localities in Vologodsky District